Héctor Noesí (born January 26, 1987) is a Dominican professional baseball pitcher who is a free agent. He has played in Major League Baseball (MLB) for the New York Yankees, Seattle Mariners, Texas Rangers, Chicago White Sox, and Miami Marlins and in the Korea Baseball Organization (KBO) for the Kia Tigers. Noesí throws and bats right-handed.

Professional career

New York Yankees
Noesí signed with the New York Yankees as an international free agent in 2004. He made his professional debut in 2006 with the Gulf Coast Yankees.  He was assigned to the Class-A Charleston RiverDogs in 2007, but was injured, necessitating Tommy John surgery.

Healthy in 2009, Noesí pitched well for Charleston and the Class-A Advanced Tampa Yankees. Following the 2009 season, Noesí was added to the 40-man roster to protect him from the Rule 5 draft.

Noesí began 2010 with Tampa, but was promoted to the Double-A Trenton Thunder, where was named Eastern League Pitcher of the Week for the week ending June 6, 2010, and the Triple-A Scranton/Wilkes-Barre Yankees. Noesí participated in the 2010 All-Star Futures Game.

On April 13, 2011, Noesí was called up to the major leagues for the first time in his career, replacing relief pitcher Luis Ayala, who the Yankees put on the disabled list. He was optioned to Triple-A on April 22 without having made his major league debut.

Noesí made his major league debut on May 18, 2011, pitching four scoreless innings of relief and earning the win in an extra-innings game against the Baltimore Orioles. He made his first MLB start on September 21, 2011.

Seattle Mariners
During the 2011–12 offseason, the Yankees traded Noesí to the Seattle Mariners along with Jesús Montero for Michael Pineda and minor league pitcher José Campos. Noesí performed badly to begin the 2012 season by going 2–11 with a 5.77 ERA and was demoted to Triple A's Tacoma Rainers on July 4, 2012.

On April 4, 2014, Noesi was designated for assignment by the Mariners.

Texas Rangers
On April 12, 2014, Noesi was traded to the Texas Rangers. He made his Rangers debut against the Mariners two days later. He was designated for assignment on April 22.

Chicago White Sox
On April 25, 2014, Noesi was claimed off waivers by the Chicago White Sox. He was designated for assignment on June 18, 2015.

Kia Tigers
Noesí signed a $1.7 million deal to pitch for the Kia Tigers of the KBO League in 2017. He became the second highest paid player in the KBO. Noesí pitched to a 20–5 win–loss record with a 3.48 earned run average during the regular season and started Game 1 of the 2017 Korean Series. On December 1, 2017, Noesí signed a one-year, $2 million contract with the Tigers. On December 4, 2018, the Tigers announced that Noesi would not return with the team due to tax concerns.

Miami Marlins
On January 17, 2019, Noesí signed a minor league contract with the Miami Marlins. On August 6, the Marlins selected Noesí's contract. On October 16, Noesí was outrighted to AAA and elected free agency the next day.

Pittsburgh Pirates
On December 17, 2019, Noesí signed a minor league contract with the Pittsburgh Pirates. On July 8, 2020, Noesí announced he would be opting out of the 2020 season. He became a free agent on November 2, 2020.

Fubon Guardians
On December 24, 2020, Noesí signed a $500,000 contract with the Fubon Guardians of the Chinese Professional Baseball League for the 2021 season. However, his contract was later terminated prior to the season on February 21, 2021 after he sustained an injury while training in the offseason.

Scouting report
Noesi throws five pitches. He leads with a four-seam fastball averaging about 93 mph, a pitch he throws about half the time. He also throws a slider and changeup in the mid 80s, a curveball in the upper 70s, and a two-seam fastball.

References

External links

1987 births
Living people
Charleston RiverDogs players
Chicago White Sox players
Dominican Republic expatriate baseball players in South Korea
Dominican Republic expatriate baseball players in the United States
Gulf Coast Yankees players
Jackson Generals (Southern League) players
KBO League pitchers
Kia Tigers players
Major League Baseball players from the Dominican Republic
Major League Baseball pitchers
Miami Marlins players
New Orleans Baby Cakes players
New York Yankees players
Scranton/Wilkes-Barre Yankees players
Seattle Mariners players
Staten Island Yankees players
Tacoma Rainiers players
Tampa Yankees players
Texas Rangers players
Tigres del Licey players
Trenton Thunder players